Adventure Electronics Inc (Aventure Électronique in Quebec) was a Canadian consumer electronics retailer with its old head office located in Anjou, Quebec.  Smaller stores, sized much like RadioShack, were called Aventure Boutique.  At that time, it was once Canada's third-largest consumer electronics retailer after RadioShack and Future Shop.

Founded in 1989 by Robert Fragman, it went bankrupt on November 16, 1998.  All Adventure Electronics' 143 stores were closed, and 1,271 jobs were lost within 85 stores in Québec and 58 in Ontario.  In an official statement, the leaders of this chain of distribution of electronic products stress that their decision was made inevitable following the loss of the financial support their principal creditors.  Scotiabank, by far the principal creditor guaranteed with a credit of almost CAD$36,000,000, had given an opinion of defect one week ago and half.  Adventure Electronics, not having been able to find the funds necessary to the re-establishment of its situation, the chain, which was committed in a plan of rectification since the beginning of 1998, had to resign itself to close its 143 stores.  This was blamed on rival Future Shop's expansion into Quebec in 1995.

With the demise of Adventure Electronics in 1998, this left Future Shop as its only big-box consumer electronics retailer until Best Buy acquired Future Shop in 2001, leading for Best Buy to open locations in Canada for 2002.

Defunct companies of Quebec
Consumer electronics retailers of Canada